The 2007 Korean Basketball League rookie draft (Korean: 2007 KBL 국내신인선수 드래프트) was held on February 1, 2007, at the Education and Cultural Center in Yangjae-dong, Seoul, South Korea. Out of the 33 participants, 25 players were drafted.

Draft selections
This table only shows the first twenty picks.

Players
Korean-language basketball-centered magazine Rookie and newspaper Sports Dong-a have both retrospectively dubbed the 2007 draft as the "Golden Draft". Players from this draft include two winners of the KBL Most Valuable Player Award, members of the team which won gold at the 2014 Asian Games and several "one-club men" (active or retired players who spent their entire playing careers with the same team). Compared to past and present draft classes, as of the 2020–21 season, more players from this draft have continued to play regularly in their respective teams and maintained their professional careers into their mid-thirties. The 2021–22 playoffs featured Yang Hee-jong, Jung Young-sam and Ham Ji-hoon, all of whom were still with their original teams.

Ham won the KBL Most Valuable Player Award in 2010. As the last pick of the first round (10th overall), he is the lowest-ranked draft pick to have won the award.

Two players from the draft were much older than the others: Park Sang-oh and Lee Dong-jun. Park previously played for Chung-Ang University's basketball team but left the sport and then completed his mandatory military service before returning to basketball. Lee became a South Korean citizen and thus qualified for the rookie draft (despite having professional experience in Europe) instead of the ethnic draft.

Notes

See also
Korean Basketball League draft

References

External links
 Draft: 2007 KBL Domestic Player draft results / 드래프트: 2007 KBL 국내신인선수 드래프트 결과 — Korean Basketball League official website 

Korean Basketball League draft
Korean Basketball League draft
2000s in Seoul
Korean Basketball League draft
Sport in Seoul
Events in Seoul